Pukaar may refer to one of the following television series:

Pukaar (Indian TV series), a 2014 Indian TV series
Pukaar (Pakistan TV series), a 2018 Pakistan TV series

See also
 Pukar (disambiguation)
 Pukara (disambiguation)